Alcimachus or Alkimachos is an ancient Greek name and may refer to:
Alcimachus (painter), a painter of the Attic red-figure vase c. 460 BC
Alcimachus, father of Agathocles of Pella
Alcimachus, father of Euphorbus, a traitor who betrayed Eretria to Persians
Alcimachus of Apollonia, first son of the Thessalian Agathocles and the eldest brother of Lysimachus, who was a general and diplomat of Alexander the Great
Alcimachus, son to the above named and nephew of Lysimachus
Alkimachos of Pydna, Macedonian-Epirote buried in Pydna
Alcimachus, an Athenian general from the deme Anagyrous
Alcimachus, a Macedonian